Tai Lam Chung Reservoir is a reservoir in Tai Lam Country Park, Tuen Mun District, New Territories, Hong Kong.

Tai Lam Chung Reservoir is the first reservoir built in Hong Kong after the Second World War. The construction work of the reservoir commenced in 1952 and was completed in 1957. Formed by a main dam across the Tai Lam Chung Valley, there are three supplemental dams that cross the nearby valley. Its water storage capacity is about 21 million cubic metres.

Several villages were flooded by the reservoir, including Tai Lam Village, Tai Wai Village, Kan Uk Tei Village and Wu Uk Village.

References

External links

 Aerial video

Infrastructure completed in 1957
Reservoirs in Hong Kong
Tai Lam Chung